Ekwok Airport  is a state-owned public-use airport serving Ekwok, a city in the Dillingham Census Area of the U.S. state of Alaska. Scheduled airline service to Merrill Field in Anchorage, AK   is provided by Dena'ina air.

As per Federal Aviation Administration records, the airport had 283 passenger boardings (enplanements) in calendar year 2008, 182 enplanements in 2009, and 284 in 2010. It is included in the National Plan of Integrated Airport Systems for 2011–2015, which categorized it as a general aviation airport (the commercial service category requires at least 2,500 enplanements per year).

Facilities and aircraft 
Ekwok Airport covers an area of 118 acres (48 ha) at an elevation of 135 feet (41 m) above mean sea level. It has one runway designated 2/20 with a gravel surface measuring 3,300 by 75 feet (1,006 x 23 m).

For the 12-month period ending December 31, 2008, the airport had 2,200 aircraft operations, an average of 183 per month: 68% air taxi and 32% general aviation.

Airlines and destinations

Dena'ina Air Taxi offers service from Ekwok to Anchorage or milk run flights through neighboring village flights to Anchorage.

References 

http://denainaair.com/site/4a89bc0130114a10bfb4d0b6abaa5bb2/default?url=http%3A%2F%2Fdenainaair.com%2FWhere_We_Fly.html#2958

External links 
 Topographic map from USGS The National Map

Airports in the Dillingham Census Area, Alaska